{{Infobox ice hockey player
| name = Hugo Bélanger
| image = 
| image_size = 
| position = Left Wing
| played_for =IHLIndianapolis IceAtlanta KnightsPhoenix Roadrunners Fort Wayne KometsECHLNashville Knights Pensacola Ice PilotsWCHLPhoenix MustangsUHLAdirondack IceHawksLNAHSorel Mission
| shoots = Left
| height_ft = 6
| height_in = 0
| weight_lb = 190
| birth_date = 
| birth_place = Saint-Hubert, PQ, CAN
| draft = 163rd overall
| draft_year = 1990
| draft_team = Chicago Blackhawks
| career_start = 1993
| career_end = 2008
| halloffame = 
}}Hugo P. Bélanger''' (born May 28, 1970) is a Canadian retired professional ice hockey left wing. Hugo Bélanger was selected in the 8th round (163rd overall) in the 1990 NHL Entry Draft by the Chicago Blackhawks and went on to play 15 seasons in hockey’s minor leagues.

Bélanger was named the Sher-Wood Most Valuable Player in the UHL four times in his UHL career, as well as the MVP of the ECHL in 1996 and the MVP of the WCHL as a member of the Phoenix Mustangs. Bélanger played a total of 1011 games in his minor league hockey career, totalling 1465 points (518 goals and 947 assists). That point total is the most scored by any player since 1980 and the fifth highest total of all-time.

Belanger also played four seasons of major league roller hockey in both the RHI (with the Long Island Jawz and Anaheim Bullfrogs) and the MLRH (with the Virginia Vultures). While playing for the Vultures, Belanger won the MLRH scoring title by 52 points (79-79-158, 20 GP), including scoring a league record 11 goals and 15 assists in one game.  Belanger was named the RHI MVP in 1996, after becoming the only player in RHI history to record a 100-point season. As a member of Team Canada, Belanger earned a gold medal in the 1998 IIHF InLine Hockey World Championship.

Belanger was inducted into the Adirondack Hockey Hall of Fame on Saturday, March 12, 2011 along with Barry Melrose and Jody Gage.

College career
Belanger played four years for the Clarkson Golden Knights in the ECAC (NCAA Division I), posting 205 points (81 goals, 124 assists) in 139 games. Belanger ranks as the third all-time scorer in Clarkson history.

Career statistics

Awards and honours

References

External links

1970 births
Living people
Atlanta Knights players
Canadian ice hockey left wingers
Chicago Blackhawks draft picks
Ice hockey people from Quebec
Nashville Knights players
Pensacola Ice Pilots players
Anaheim Bullfrogs players
Long Island Jawz players
Clarkson Golden Knights men's ice hockey players